BlackRock World Mining Trust is a British investment trust dedicated to investments in mining and metals. Established in 1993, the trust is listed on the London Stock Exchange and is a constituent of the FTSE 250 Index. It is based in London. The fund is managed by the UK subsidiary of BlackRock.

References

External links
 BlackRock World Mining Trust - Official site

Financial services companies established in 1993
Investment trusts of the United Kingdom
Companies listed on the London Stock Exchange